The Olympisch Stadion or Kielstadion ) was built as the main stadium for the 1920 Summer Olympics in Antwerp. For those games, it hosted the athletics, equestrian, field hockey, football, gymnastics, modern pentathlon, rugby union, tug of war, weightlifting and korfball (demonstration) events. Following the Olympics it was converted to a football stadium. Its current tenant is K Beerschot VA, a Belgian football club. There are no remnants of the Olympic athletics track.

It is possible that Archibald Leitch was involved in the design of the stadium having made several visits prior to the Games.

References

External links

 IOC Antwerp 1920 Page: The IOC page of 1920 Summer Olympics includes a photo gallery with images of the stadium.
 Olympisch Stadion (Antwerp)
 : Information and photos of the Olympisch Stadion  

Venues of the 1920 Summer Olympics
Olympic athletics venues
Olympic equestrian venues
Olympic field hockey venues
Olympic football venues
Olympic gymnastics venues
Olympic modern pentathlon venues
Olympic weightlifting venues
Antwerp
Sports venues completed in 1920
Olympic rugby union venues
Rugby union stadiums in Belgium
Athletics (track and field) venues in Belgium
Football venues in Flanders
Sports venues in Antwerp Province
Sport in Antwerp
Buildings and structures in Antwerp
K. Beerschot V.A.C.
Beerschot A.C.
1920 establishments in Belgium